Drum & Lace is an electronic trip-hop composer from Florence, Italy. Formed in 2013, their music is written, scored, recorded, and produced by Sofia Hultquist.  Hultquist is best known for co-composing the soundtrack to The First Monday in May with Ian Hultquist, and for composition and sound design in fashion, film, and media.

Early life and influences 
Lead composer Hultquist was born and raised in Florence, Italy. As a child she began learning classical piano at the age of seven and developed a love of music and the arts. Several years later, she began taking voice lessons. In high school, she began learning drums and guitar.

She cites her early influences as the albums Jagged Little Pill and Magic Kingdom, and musicians of the 1960s and 1970s including Led Zeppelin, Cream, The Who, and The Rolling Stones. She later discovered The Bends, OK Computer, and Homogenic which she says "changed everything".

She relocated to the United States to attend the Berklee College of Music in Boston, where she received her Undergraduate Degree in Film Scoring and Composition, and New York University, where she received her Master's degree in Music Technology and Composition.

After college, she performed in a dream-pop duo called Aislyn until 2013. She then formed Drum & Lace.

Career

Albums and singles 
In 2016, Drum & Lace released two EPs, Dark Nights & Neon Lights and The Giving & the Taking. In 2017, they released the single Drive, an original EP Midnight Roses, and the remixed EP Sunrises.

Their albums have received positive reviews from media outlets, with Vehlinggo describing their compositions as "usually cinematic, often danceable, and always compelling."

Composition and sound design 
In 2013, Hultquist formed Drum & Lace, combining her love for music and fashion, and pursued composition for fashion media.

Drum & Lace has composed original music and soundscapes to accompany runway shows, presentations, events, documentaries, short films, and campaigns, especially those that focus on ethical fashion, and advocates for sustainable fashion. They are known for their "ornate, beat-heavy, pop-infused, ambient electronic" aesthetic and have worked extensively with fashion clients on commissioned projects, including Diane von Fürstenberg, St. John, Lotuff Leather, Atelier Delphine, Palatines, Tanya Taylor, and À Moi for New York Fashion Week.

In 2016, Sofia Hultquist of Drum & Lace, and Ian Hultquist co-composed the music for the documentary film The First Monday in May. The film opened the 2017 Tribeca Film Festival and follows the most attended fashion exhibit in the Metropolitan Museum of Art's history, China: Through the Looking Glass in 2015. The film was nominated for Best Documentary Feature Film and Audience Award at the Edinburgh International Film Festival. That same year, Drum & Lace also composed the music and contributed vocals to the soundtrack for the films Silicon Cowboys and My Blind Brother, which starred Jenny Slate, Adam Scott, Zoe Kazan, and Nick Kroll. Both films premiered at the SXSW Film Festival.

In 2017, Sofia Hultquist and Ian Hultquist co-composed the music for the feature film The Gospel According to André, which premiered at the Toronto International Film Festival.

Drum & Lace is a member of the Global Alliance for Women Film Composers.

Discography

Filmography

Film

Television

Awards and nominations 
In 2017, Drum & Lace was one of six women who were included on the Academy Award shortlist of composers for Best Original Score for The First Monday in May.

References

External links 
 Drum & Lace Official Site
 Drum & Lace on SoundCloud
 Drum & Lace on Spotify

Italian electronic music groups
Berklee College of Music alumni
New York University alumni
Italian film score composers
Italian emigrants to the United States